N84  may refer to:
 Escadrille N.84, a unit of the French Air Force
 , a submarine of the Royal Navy
 N84 road (Ireland)
 Nebraska Highway 84, in the United States
 Volvo N84, a Swedish truck